Asthi is a 1983 Indian Malayalam film, directed by Ravi and produced by Babu Sait. The film stars Bharath Gopi, Ambika, Rony Vincent and Thilakan in the lead roles. The film has musical score by G. Devarajan.

Cast

Bharath Gopi as Mohan 
Ambika as Priyamvada
Rony Vincent as Rajasekharan
Thilakan 
Sreenivasan as Gopi
Vijay Menon as Dileep
Vijayan Karote
Krishnankutty Nair as Kumaran Nair
Rajkumar as Krishnamoorthy
K. P. A. C. Azeez as Govindan
Iringal Narayani
P. R. Menon
Ragini as Saritha
Subhashini as Elizabeth
Suchitra as Rajalakshmi

Soundtrack
The music was composed by G. Devarajan and the lyrics were written by Poovachal Khader.

References

External links
 

1983 films
1980s Malayalam-language films